Ficus lutea is a tree in the family Moraceae. It is commonly known as the giant-leaved fig or Lagos rubbertree. These trees occur from the Eastern Cape of South Africa to Tropical Africa.

References 
 Pooley, E. (1993). The Complete Field Guide to Trees of Natal, Zululand and Transkei. .

External links

lutea